John Paye (born March 30, 1965) is a former American football quarterback in the National Football League (NFL) and a high school basketball coach.

Early life
A 1983 graduate of Menlo School in Atherton, California, Paye lettered in baseball, basketball, and football. In his senior year, Menlo won the California Interscholastic Federation (CIF) Division II basketball championship. One of Paye's teammates was Eric Reveno, who played with Paye on the Stanford basketball team and is currently an assistant basketball coach at Georgia Tech.

College and professional career
Paye continued as a starter in football and basketball at Stanford University in the Pac-10 Conference. With All-American John Elway moving on to the NFL, Paye won the starting job at quarterback as a true freshman in 1983, and also started at point guard that year for the Cardinal basketball team; he was the last NCAA Division I athlete to start in both football and basketball as a freshman.

In the 1984 football season, Paye shared time at quarterback with Fred Buckley, and became the starter for the 1985 and 1986 season. In 1986, he led Stanford to an  record and an invitation to the Gator Bowl against the Clemson Tigers. This was Stanford's first bowl appearance in eight years, but Paye was unable to play due to a shoulder injury. Backup Greg Ennis started instead, and Stanford lost a close game, 

Paye was selected in the tenth round of the 1987 NFL Draft by the San Francisco 49ers and stayed two seasons with the team, but saw no action in the regular season.

Coaching career
After leaving pro football, Paye returned to Menlo as the girls' basketball coach, coaching his sister Kate. Paye guided the team to three CIF Division V state championships from  He coached boys' basketball at Woodside Priory School in the  season and coached girls' basketball at Notre Dame High School girls' basketball team in Belmont, California. He returned to coach girls' basketball again at Menlo School in 2008, where his team won another CIF state championship, this time in Division II, in 2019.

References

External links

1965 births
Living people
American football quarterbacks
San Francisco 49ers players
Stanford Cardinal football players
Stanford Cardinal men's basketball players
Sportspeople from Santa Clara County, California
High school basketball coaches in the United States
People from Atherton, California
People from Stanford, California
Players of American football from California
American men's basketball players
Point guards